Aeneas MacBean WS (1776–1857) was a Scottish lawyer with a prestigious office on Charlotte Square in Edinburgh. The name appears to be a corruption of McBain.

Life

He was born on 11 September 1776 in Ardersier near Inverness, the son of Alexander MacBean (1745-1790), a farmer, and his wife, Rose Grant Campbeltown (1755-1830). He was baptised on 6 July 1790. His father is noted as a merchant at the time of his death.

He appears in practice in Edinburgh in 1810 at 14 North Castle Street and is already listed as a Writer to the Signet although only 20 years old.

In 1815 he had premises at 65 Castle Street but within 5 years had moved to prestigious offices at 11 Charlotte Square, part of an exceptionally large and beautiful pavilion block in a terrace by Robert Adam (the office is accessed from Glenfinlas Street). He maintained the office on Charlotte Square for four decades. He primarily dealt with wills and estates for rich clients. He appears as a trustee in the will of several famous people including Hugh William Williams. He was property agent for many wealthy highland clients.

He had offices at 11 Charlotte Square and lived at 63 Great King Street.

In 1836 he was signatory to a petition against the behaviour of Henry Brougham, Lord Brougham.

He died on 31 August 1857 and was buried on 4 September 1857. His grave lies on the upper terrace of St John's Episcopal Church, Edinburgh on Princes Street, only 100m from his home on Charlotte Square.

Family
His paternal uncle was Rev William MacBean of Alvie (d.1818).

His younger brother was Rev Hugh MacBean (1780-1851) of Ardclach.

His nephew Aeneas MacBean (1822-1899) was also a lawyer (buried in Dean Cemetery).

References

1776 births
1857 deaths
People from Highland (council area)
Scottish lawyers
Burials at St John's, Edinburgh